Results and statistics for the Australian Lacrosse League season of 2004, the inaugural season for the ALL.

Game 1 
Saturday, 23 October 2004, Melbourne, Victoria

Goalscorers:
Vic: D Pusvacietis 3–1, D Stiglich 3–1, W Henderson 2-2, D Nicholas 2–1, R Stark 2, R Garnsworthy 1, M Sevior 1.
WA: C Hayes 2, J Stack 2, L Blackie 1, W Curran 1, K Gillespie 1, N Rainey 1, T Roost 1, A Sear 1, D Whiteman 0–3.

Game 2 
Sunday, 24 October 2004, Melbourne, Victoria

Goalscorers:
Vic: D Stiglich 3, W Henderson 2–1, D Nicholas 2, D Pusvacietis 1–3, D Arnell 1, J Brammell 1, R Stark 0–1.
WA: D Whiteman 3–1, C Hayes 1-1, D Spreadborough 1-1, N Rainey 1, T Roost 1, J Stack 1, L Blackie 0–1, B Goddard 0–1.

Game 3 
Saturday, 30 October 2004, Adelaide, South Australia

Goalscorers:
SA: B Howe 4, M Mangan 3, L Perham 2, A Carter 1, A Feleppa 1, S Gilbert 1, N Wapper 1.
Vic: D Stiglich 3, D Arnell 2, D Pusvacietis 2, J Ardossi 1, M Sevoir 1, knocked-in 2.

Game 4 
Sunday, 31 October 2004, Adelaide, South Australia

Goalscorers:
SA: L Perham 3–1, A Feleppa 2-2, B Howe 2, N Wapper 2, M Mangan 1–4, A Carter 0–1, R Stone 0–1.
Vic: D Nicholas 3–1, D Stiglich 3–1, J Joy 3, D Pusvacietis 1–3, A Lawman 1-1, T Fry 1, W Henderson 1, M Sevoir 1, N Le Guen 0–1.

Game 5 
Saturday, 6 November 2004, Perth, Western Australia

Goalscorers:
WA: A Sear 3, A Ettridge 2, D Spreadborough 1-1, G Allen 1, A Brown 1, N Rainey 1.
SA: N Wapper 2, S Robb 1–2, L Perham 1-1, A Feleppa 1, S Gilbert 1, M Mangan 1.

Game 6 
Sunday, 7 November 2004, Perth, Western Australia

Goalscorers:
WA: D Whiteman 6, R Brown 2, A Sear 2, A Ettridge 1, C Hayes 1, D Spreadborough 1.
SA: B Howe 4, S Gilbert 2, L Perham 2, A Carter 1, M Mangan 1, J Pangrazio 1.

ALL Table 2004 
Table after completion of round-robin tournament

FINAL (Game 7) 
Saturday, 13 November 2004, Melbourne, Victoria

Goalscorers:
Vic: D Nicholas 5–1, D Pusvacietis 3–2, J Ardossi 2–1, A Lawman 2, D Stiglich 1–2, D Arnall 1, J Joy 1, J Tokarua 1, M Sevoir 0–1.
WA: A Sear 3, D Whiteman 2, D Spreadborough 2, N Rainey 0–2, G Morley 0–1.

All-Stars 
 ALL 2004 Champions: Victoria
 ALL 2004 Most Valuable Player: Russell Brown (WA)
 ALL 2004 All-Stars: Darren Nicholas, Daniel Pusvacietis, John Tokarua, Scott Garnsworthy, Cameron Shepherd, Daniel Stiglich (Vic), Russell Brown, David Whiteman, Nathan Rainey, Adam Sear (WA), Leigh Perham, Brett Howe, Mark Mangan (SA). Coach: Duncan McKenzie (Vic). Referee: Rolf Kraus

See also 
Lacrosse
Australian Lacrosse League
Lacrosse in Australia

External links 
 Australian Lacrosse League
 Lacrosse Australia
 Lacrosse South Australia
 Lacrosse Victoria
 Western Australian Lacrosse Association

Australian Lacrosse League
lacrosse
Australian